Diarmaid Ua Madadhan (died 1135) was King of Síol Anmchadha and Uí Maine.

Background
Diarmaid was the son of Madudan Reamhar Ua Madadhan (died 1096). In addition to ruling Síol Anmchadha, he was the last of his dynasty to gain overlordship of Uí Maine, ca. 1134.

Ua Fuirg and Ua Ceannéidigh
In 1131 he was responsible for the slaying of Domhnaill Ua Fuirg, lord of Uí Forgo. This led to his own death in 1135 by Gilla Caoimhin Ua Ceannéidigh, to whom Ua Fuirg was a dependent. He was succeeded by Cú Coirne Ua Madadhan, who ruled from 1135 to 1158.

Family
The names of Diarmaid's spouses and partners do not seem to be recorded. He is listed as having the following male issue:
 Madudan Mór Ua Madadhan, who became chief in 1158
 Murchadh
 Conchobhar, whose son Murchad became chief of half of Síol Anmchadha, and died in 1201
 Maelsechlainn Ua Madadhan, chief from 1158 to 1188.

A poem described Diarmaid as without weakness or error.

References

 The Tribes and customs of Hy-Many, John O'Donovan, 1843
 O'Madáin: History of the O'Maddens of Hy-Many, Gerard Madden, 2004. .
 Annals of Ulster at CELT: Corpus of Electronic Texts at University College Cork
 Annals of Tigernach at CELT: Corpus of Electronic Texts at University College Cork
Revised edition of McCarthy's synchronisms at Trinity College Dublin.

People from County Galway
12th-century Irish monarchs
1135 deaths
Kings of Uí Maine
Year of birth unknown